Tony Martin (born 10 May 1981) is an English professional darts player who plays in Professional Darts Corporation (PDC) events.

Career 

Martin started his darts career playing in British Darts Organisation tournaments and was a runner-up in the British Classic to Mervyn King in 2002. He reached other finals at the Swedish Open in 2004 losing to Shaun Greatbatch and the Norway Open in 2005 losing to Michael van Gerwen. He also reached the quarter finals of the Dutch Open in 2004.

Tony started playing with Merseyside youth at the age of 18. At the age of 21, he was selected to play for the county of Clwyd. In his first season, he gained the British Darts Organisation Young Player of the Year Award.

He only managed one appearance at the Lakeside Country Club for the BDO World Darts Championship when he lost a first round match in 2005 to Simon Whitlock.

He switched to compete in the Professional Darts Corporation for several months but announced in August 2007 that he would be returning to compete on the BDO circuit. having lost his main sponsor Masterdarts. He also switched to be on the same circuit as his wife Anastasia Dobromyslova. His wife moved across to the PDC in December 2008 which in turn left Martin playing on a different circuit again. It was announced however during the 2009 Grand Slam of Darts that Martin would be competing in the PDC once more, starting in January 2010.

However his season in the PDC was difficult as he suffered from loss of form and had injury problems, As a result, he did not get a tour card.

World Championship performances

BDO 

 2005: 1st Round (lost to Simon Whitlock 1–3)

References

External links 
Profile and stats on Darts Database

1981 births
English darts players
Living people
British Darts Organisation players
Professional Darts Corporation former pro tour players